William Brady may refer to:
 William Brady (footballer) (born 1870), Scottish footballer
 William Brady (physician) (1880–1972), American physician and columnist
 William A. Brady (1863–1950), American boxing manager and play producer
 William Gage Brady Jr. (1888–1966), chairman of the National City Bank of New York
 William H. Brady (1912–1996), Episcopal bishop of Fond du Lac in America
 William J. Brady (1829–1878), sheriff of Lincoln County during the Lincoln County Wars in New Mexico, USA
 William Maziere Brady (1825–1894), Irish priest, ecclesiastical historian and journalist
 William O. Brady (1899–1961), Roman Catholic archbishop in America
 William Robert Brady (born 1956), Kansas state legislator
 William V. Brady (1811–1870), mayor of New York 1847–1848
 Will P. Brady (1876–1943), American lawyer and judge

See also
 Bill Brady (disambiguation)